The Progressive Democratic Party (PDS) is an ethnic Serb political party in Kosovo led by Nenad Rašić.

History
The party was established by Rašić in April 2014 after he left the Independent Liberal Party. In the June 2014 elections the party won one of the ten seats reserved for Serbs in the Assembly, taken by Rašić. In 2015 he joined the Serb List parliamentary group.

References

Political parties in Kosovo
Serb political parties in Kosovo
Political parties established in 2014
2014 establishments in Kosovo